Presidential elections were held in Colombia on 27 November 1949. The result was a victory for Laureano Gómez of the Conservative Party, who received all but 23 of the 1.1 million valid votes cast. The opposition Liberal Party withdrew from the election and called for a boycott after their candidate Darío Echandía was the victim of a failed assassination attempt.

It is widely speculated that Jorge Eliécer Gaitán would likely have been elected President had he not been assassinated on 9 April 1948. This assassination occurred immediately prior to the armed insurrection or Bogotazo.

Results

References

Bibliography

Presidential elections in Colombia
1949 in Colombia
Colombia
Election and referendum articles with incomplete results